Chembur Station is a railway station in Chembur on the Harbour Line of the Mumbai Suburban Railway network. It lies near Chembur Market. It has one train in the morning starting from this station. It has two platforms which serves North and South bound railway line.

The Chembur Monorail Station is connected with a skywalk to the Chembur Railway Station.

History 
The Kurla–Chembur single line was built in 1906 for garbage trains. It was opened to passenger traffic in the year 1924. The Kurla–Mankhurd section which also contained Chembur was electrified in 1950 and suburban steam services were run on one track from 1951.

Access

The station provides noise indicators for the blind to help them spot where their compartment comes in. It does not have ramp for the disabled. The Station Master's Office has the First Aid Box. The station can be reached by road on both East and West side.

References              

Railway stations in Mumbai Suburban district
Mumbai Suburban Railway stations
Mumbai CR railway division
Railway stations opened in 1906
1906 establishments in India